The 1948–49 New York Knicks season was the third season for the team in the Basketball Association of America (BAA), which later became the National Basketball Association (NBA). The Knicks had a 32–28 record in 1948–49 and finished second in the Eastern Division, six games behind the Washington Capitols. New York qualified for the playoffs, and defeated the Baltimore Bullets 2–1 in a best-of-three series to earn a place in the Eastern Division Finals. In the division championship series, the Knicks lost to the Capitols, two games to one. Before the 1949–50 season, the BAA merged with the National Basketball League to form the NBA.

Draft

Source:

Roster

Regular season

Season standings

Record vs. opponents

Game log

Playoffs

|- align="center" bgcolor="#ffcccc"
| 1
| March 23
| @ Baltimore
| L 81–82
| Carl Braun (21)
| Baltimore Coliseum
| 0–1
|- align="center" bgcolor="#ccffcc"
| 2
| March 24
| Baltimore
| W 84–74
| Carl Braun (20)
| Madison Square Garden III
| 1–1
|- align="center" bgcolor="#ccffcc"
| 3
| March 26
| Baltimore
| W 103–99 (OT)
| Harry Gallatin (21)
| Madison Square Garden III
| 2–1
|-

|- align="center" bgcolor="#ffcccc"
| 1
| March 29
| @ Washington
| L 71–77
| Harry Gallatin (17)
| National Guard Armory
| 0–1
|- align="center" bgcolor="#ccffcc"
| 2
| March 31
| Washington
| W 86–84 (OT)
| Carl Braun (30)
| Madison Square Garden III
| 1–1
|- align="center" bgcolor="#ffcccc"
| 3
| April 2
| @ Washington
| L 76–84
| Braun, Gallatin (15)
| National Guard Armory
| 1–2
|-

References

External links
1948–49 New York Knickerbockers Statistics

New York Knicks seasons
New York
New York Knicks
New York Knicks
1940s in Manhattan
Madison Square Garden